Direct linear transformation (DLT) is an algorithm which solves a set of variables from a set of similarity relations:

    for 

This type of relation appears frequently in projective geometry.  Practical examples include the relation between 3D points in a scene and their projection onto the image plane of a pinhole camera, and homographies.

Introduction 

An ordinary system of linear equations

    for 

Given that there exists a unique solution, it is given by

 

Solutions can also be described in the case that the equations are over or under determined.

What makes the direct linear transformation problem distinct from the above standard case is the fact that the left and right sides of the defining equation can differ by an unknown multiplicative factor which is dependent on k.  As a consequence,  cannot be computed as in the standard case.  Instead, the similarity relations are rewritten as proper linear homogeneous equations which then can be solved by a standard method.  The combination of rewriting the similarity equations as homogeneous linear equations and solving them by standard methods is referred to as a direct linear transformation algorithm or DLT algorithm. DLT is attributed to Ivan Sutherland.

Example 

Suppose that . Let  and  be two known vectors, and we want to find the  matrix  such that

 

where  is the unknown scalar factor related to equation k.

To get rid of the unknown scalars and obtain homogeneous equations, define the anti-symmetric matrix

 

Since  the following homogeneous equations, which no longer contain the unknown scalars, are at hand

 

 ,   ,   and   

and the above homogeneous equation becomes

    for 

This can also be written in the matrix form:

   for 

where  and  both are 6-dimensional vectors defined as

    and   

So far, we have 1 equation and 6 unknowns. A set of homogeneous equations can be written in the matrix form

where  is a  matrix which holds the known vectors  in its rows. Once  has been determined, the elements of matrix  can rearranged from vector .

In practice the vectors  and  may contain noise which means that the similarity equations are only approximately valid.  As a consequence, there may not be a vector  which solves the homogeneous equation  exactly.  In these cases, a total least squares solution can be used by choosing  as a right singular vector corresponding to the smallest singular value of

More general cases 

If  and  the previous expressions can still lead to an equation

    for   

When  the space of such matrices is no longer one-dimensional, it is of dimension

 

This means that each value of k provides M homogeneous equations of the type

    for      and for 

where  is a M-dimensional basis of the space of  anti-symmetric matrices.

Example p = 3 

In the case that p = 3 the following three matrices  can be chosen

 ,   ,   

In this particular case, the homogeneous linear equations can be written as

    for   

where  is the matrix representation of the vector cross product.

However, since  has rank = 2, at most two equations are linearly independent. In practice, therefore, it is common to only use two of the three matrices , for example, for m=1, 2. As a consequence, if the number of equations is not a concern, it may be better to use all three equations when the matrix  is constructed.

The linear dependence between the resulting homogeneous linear equations is a general concern for the case p > 2 and has to be dealt with either by reducing the set of anti-symmetric matrices  or by allowing  to become larger than necessary for determining

References

External links 
 Homography Estimation by Elan Dubrofsky (§2.1 sketches the "Basic DLT Algorithm")

 A DLT Solver based on MATLAB by Hsiang-Jen (Johnny) Chien

Geometry in computer vision
Projective geometry